Andrew Philip de Boorder (born 6 July 1988 in Hastings, New Zealand) is a cricketer. He was a member of the New Zealand Under 19 side and is currently a member of the Auckland Aces side.

Early life
De Boorder attended Macleans College in his early high school years and later attended Kings College. De Boorder represented New Zealand in the Under-19 Cricket World Cup held in Sri Lanka in 2006.

First class
He debuted for the Auckland team in March 2008, scoring 88. The match was notable for including England fast bowler James Anderson in the playing XI. He plays club cricket for the Howick Pakuranga Cricket Club.

See also
 List of Auckland representative cricketers

References

External links

1988 births
Living people
New Zealand cricketers
Auckland cricketers
Cricketers from Hastings, New Zealand
New Zealand people of Dutch descent
People educated at Macleans College